Fjordcentret Voer Færgested is a nature center in Denmark, located south of Randers Fjord. Located near Voer Færgested  a dock for ferries to 
Mellerup north of the fjord.

The nature center features activities like:
 an exhibition
 voyage by canon 
 fishing
 a trip in the water, with waders.

The exhibition includes topics like plants, life in the water, protection of water environment etc.

External links
Fjordcentret Homepage

Danish culture
Nature centers in Denmark
Buildings and structures in the Central Denmark Region
Tourist attractions in the Central Denmark Region